Gracillaria ussuriella is a moth of the family Gracillariidae. It is known from the islands of Hokkaidō, Honshū and Kyūshū in Japan and the Russian Far East.

The wingspan is 9.8–12 mm.

The larvae feed on Fraxinus species, including Fraxinus americana, Fraxinus chinensis, Fraxinus mandshurica and Fraxinus pennsylvanica. They mine the leaves of their host plant. The mine made by the larva of the first three instars is large, lower-parenchymal, and tentiformed. The leaf roll made by the larva of the late instars is conical, or often cigarette-formed when many larvae inhabit a single leaflet. The cocoons are ordinarily formed inside the leaf roll. They are shining white and spindle-shaped. The species probably hibernates in the adult stage.

References

Gracillariinae
Moths of Japan
Moths described in 1977